General Bartlett may refer to:

George L. Bartlett (born 1924), U.S. Marine Corps brigadier general
George True Bartlett (1856–1949), U.S. Army major general
Gerald T. Bartlett (born 1936), U.S. Army lieutenant general
Joseph J. Bartlett (1834–1893), Union Army brigadier general
William Francis Bartlett (1840–1876), Union Army brigadier general and brevet major general